Amy Sue Vruwink is a former Democratic Party member of the Wisconsin State Assembly, and represented the 70th Assembly District from 2002 to 2015.

Career
Born in Wisconsin Rapids, Wisconsin, Vruwink graduated from Auburndale High School and then from Marian University. Vruwink was a former aide to Congressman David Obey and the area program director for the Minnesota Farm Bureau. On November 6, 2012, Vruwink narrowly defeated her Republican opponent Nancy L. VanderMeer. Vruwink was defeated by VanderMeer on November 4, 2014.

Notes

External links
 
 Follow the Money - Amy Sue Vruwink
2008 2006 2004 2002 2000 campaign contributions
Campaign 2008 campaign contributions at Wisconsin Democracy Campaign

Democratic Party members of the Wisconsin State Assembly
1975 births
Living people
Women state legislators in Wisconsin
People from Wisconsin Rapids, Wisconsin
Marian University (Wisconsin) alumni
People from Milladore, Wisconsin
21st-century American politicians
21st-century American women politicians